Pittsboro Historic District is a national historic district located at Pittsboro, Chatham County, North Carolina.  The district encompasses 131 contributing buildings, 3 contributing sites, and 1 contributing object in the county seat of Pittsboro. Located in the district and separately listed are the Chatham County Courthouse, the Hall-London House, the Moore-Manning House, the Reid House, the Lewis Freeman House, the McClenahan House, and the Patrick St. Lawrence House. Other notable buildings include the Blair Hotel, Pilkington Drug Store / S & T' s Soda Shoppe, Justice Motor Company building (1949), St. Bartholomew's Episcopal Church (1832), Pittsboro United Methodist Church (c. 1836), and Queen Anne style Henry H. Fike House (c. 1895).

It was listed on the National Register of Historic Places in 2000.

References

Historic districts on the National Register of Historic Places in North Carolina
Queen Anne architecture in North Carolina
Historic districts in Chatham County, North Carolina
National Register of Historic Places in Chatham County, North Carolina
Pittsboro, North Carolina